Eyvazlılar or Eyvazalılar or Eyvazallar may refer to:

Eyvazlılar, Azerbaijan
Eyvazalılar, Azerbaijan